Alessandro Damen (born 17 May 1990) is a Dutch professional footballer who plays as a goalkeeper for SV Spakenburg.

Club career
Damen joined Excelsior from amateur side De Meern in 2014, but has been plagued by injuries on both knees since.

On 4 August 2021, he signed with Heracles Almelo for the 2021–22 season. On 31 January 2022, Damen was loaned to ADO Den Haag.

On 2 June 2022, Damen signed with Spakenburg.

References

External links
 
 
 Profile - Voetbal International

1990 births
Living people
People from Nieuwegein
Association football goalkeepers
Dutch footballers
Excelsior Rotterdam players
Heracles Almelo players
ADO Den Haag players
SV Spakenburg players
Eredivisie players
Eerste Divisie players
Footballers from Utrecht (province)